Tambja morosa, also known as Tambja kushimotoensis or gloomy nudibranch, is a species of sea slug, a dorid nudibranch, a shell-less marine gastropod mollusk in the subfamily Nembrothinae within the family Polyceridae.

This species is instead sometimes placed in the family Gymnodorididae.

Distribution
The distribution of this species is primarily Indo-Pacific. It is found in the Philippines, Indonesia, Thailand, Myanmar, Malaysia, New Zealand, Solomon Islands, Taiwan, Australia, French Polynesia, Fiji and Hawaii.

Description
This large species of Tambja grows to approximately 70–75 mm in length. This species is normally black with blue markings, although dark green specimens are found in the cooler waters of New South Wales and northern New Zealand. The skin of this slug is wrinkled, and it appears nearly black underwater. It has approximately five round, blue spots on its back, a blue band around its head, and a bright blue margin.

Diet
Tambja morosa feeds on arborescent bryozoan colonies.

References

 Pola M., Cervera J.L. & Gosliner T.M. (2006) Taxonomic revision and phylogenetic analysis of the genus Tambja Burn, 1962 (Mollusca, Nudibranchia, Polyceridae). Zoologica Scripta 35(5):491-530.

Further reading
 Baba, K. (1987) Two new green colored species of Tambja from Japan (Nudibranchia: Polyceridae). Venus, The Japanese Journal of Malacology, 46(1): 13-18.
 Marshall, J.G. & Willan, R.C. (1999) Nudibranchs of Heron Island, Great Barrier Reef.

External links
 Image of Tambja morosa
 Images of Tambja morosa
 Tambja morosa at Sea Slugs of Hawaii
 

Polyceridae
Gastropods described in 1877